

The Chatelain AC-5 is a 1950s French two-seat homebuilt aircraft designed by Armand Chatelain.

Development
The AC-5 was a high-wing monoplane with a wing of all-wood construction and a fuselage made of steel tubes.

Specifications

References

1950s French civil utility aircraft
Homebuilt aircraft
Single-engined tractor aircraft
Aircraft first flown in 1956